Chionodes spirodoxa is a moth in the family Gelechiidae. It is found in Brazil.

References

Chionodes
Moths described in 1931
Moths of South America